Myles Breen is an Irish actor, performer, writer and storyteller.

Biography 
Myles Breen was born and raised in Limerick City, Ireland. As a child, he attended speech and drama classes and competed in Féile Luimnigh. He attended University College Cork in the early 1980s and was a member of the UCC Dramatic Society. He was a founding member of the Bottom Dog Theatre Company in 2008. 

He was the playwright one-man show Language Unbecoming a Lady was originally produced in 2009 for Limerick Pride. It was later performed nationally and at the Origins Irish Festival in New York (2015), for which he won the best actor award at the festival. He also wrote The Bachelor of Kilkish (2014) which was originally performed in Lime Tree Theatre. He wrote and performed in A Wilde Fan (2021), an homage to Oscar Wilde. All three of these productions were directed by Liam O'Brien (Irish actor). Breen has made several television and film performances, including Killinaskully, The Clash of the Ash (1987), Northanger Abbey (2007 film), Corp & Anam (2011), and Harvey: The Monster Catcher (2012).

In 2014, he was honoured with a Limerick Person of the Month award. Two years later, he was selected as the Grand Marshall of the Limerick Pride Parade.

References

External links 

 

Irish male film actors
Irish male stage actors
Irish male television actors
Male actors from County Limerick
Actors from County Limerick